= Ernest Mancini =

American geologist

Ernest A. Mancini is an American geologist. He is currently Professor Emeritus and previously Distinguished Research Professor of geology at University of Alabama.
